Oli Wilson is a New Zealand ethnomusicologist and a member of The Chills.

Academic career 
Wilson was raised in Palmerston North, the son of deer researcher Peter Wilson, who retired as Professor Emeritus at Massey University. He graduated with a Bachelor of Music from the University of Otago in 2007, and completed his PhD there in 2012 with a thesis entitled Ples and the production of Lokal music in Port Moresby, Papua New Guinea. His PhD work while based at the University of Papua New Guinea studied the production of pop music (known as Lokal music) in Port Moresby.

After working as a lecturer in Otago University's Music Department, Wilson joined Massey University's College of Creative Arts in 2015 as programme leader of the new Wellington-based commercial music degree. He is currently an Associate Professor and Director of Research at the College of Creative Arts.

Research 
One of Wilson's research areas is the transformation of the music industry in Papua New Guinea with the increasing access to recording technology. He studies the way the music industry operates, both in New Zealand and overseas, from the viewpoint of a practising musician and a ethnographer.

Wilson is currently the co-editor of the journal Perfect Beat: The Asia Pacific Journal of Contemporary Music and Popular Culture.

Music 

A classically-trained pianist, Wilson was a founder member of the four-piece Dunedin self-described "doom pop" band Knives at Noon, and played keyboards on their EP Glitter Guts.

Since 2010 Wilson has been a keyboard player for the iconic Dunedin band The Chills. He toured Australia and New Zealand with both Knives at Noon and The Chills, and has toured Europe, Britain, and the USA with the latter.

Selected research

References

External links 

 Massey University staff profile

Living people
Year of birth missing (living people)
Academic staff of the Massey University
University of Otago alumni
People from Palmerston North
New Zealand musicians
New Zealand musicologists